Max Michaelis Ehrlich (7 December 1892 – 1 October 1944) was a German actor, screenwriter, and director on the German theater, comedy and cabaret scene of the 1930s.

Ehrlich began his career in the 1920s at various theatres, including leading roles in Max Reinhardt productions and revues. He appeared in 42 films, ten of which he directed, and on eight records. He wrote several books, including From Adelbert to Zilzer, his best-selling humorous collection of stories and anecdotes about sixty-two of his best known show business friends and colleagues.

Career in Nazi Germany

In 1933, the National Socialists seized power and stopped Ehrlich and his other Jewish colleagues from working in Germany. As a result, he left for Vienna to appear with the Rudolf Nelson Revue. However, there too, Austrian anti-Semites interrupted the show with cries of "Jews, get out of Vienna." Consequently, the troupe left for The Netherlands, stopping en route for stage appearances in Switzerland.

In 1935, homesick for his native land, Ehrlich returned to Nazi Germany. Jewish entertainers once again were permitted to perform there but only within the framework of the Jüdischer Kulturbund (Jewish Cultural Union) and exclusively in front of Jewish audiences. Ehrlich was named director of the Kulturbund's light theatre departments. However, following the 1938 pogrom "Kristallnacht," he decided to leave Germany definitively. Both of his farewell performances immediately sold out, so that a third presentation on 2 April 1939 was added. Here, in front of a full house of fans, calling out their affection and encouragement, Ehrlich made his final appearance in Germany.

Westerbork

Subsequently, he returned to the Netherlands once again and joined Willy Rosen's "Theater der Prominenten" (Theatre of Celebrities), until in 1943 –like so many of his colleagues– Ehrlich was imprisoned in the Westerbork concentration camp. While at Westerbork, he created and became director of the "Camp Westerbork Theatre Group," a cabaret troupe that during its eighteen-month existence staged six major theatre productions, all within the concentration camp's confines. A majority of the actors were famous Jewish show business personalities; prominent artists from Berlin and Vienna, such as Willy Rosen, Erich Ziegler, Camilla Spira, and Kurt Gerron; or well known Dutch performers, like Esther Philipse, Jetty Cantor, and Johnny & Jones. At its high point, the group counted fifty-one members, including a full team of musicians, dancers, choreographers, artists, tailors, and make-up, lighting, and other technicians, as well as stage hands.

Most of the shows combined elements of revue and cabaret –songs and sketches– but, on one occasion, the program included a revue-operetta, Ludmilla, or Corpses Everywhere—a production whose theme sadly was a premonition of the actors' and other prisoners' fate. While some scenes were implicitly critical, of course, the Theatre Group at no time produced openly political cabaret or directly attacked the Nazi regime. To do so would have violated the most fundamental condition for the troupe's and its members' survival, as life in Westerbork was dominated by the persistent threat of deportation on the next transport to an unknown but deeply feared fate in the East. So, standing helplessly and unaided before the fascists' executioners and their lackeys, the Theatre Group, of necessity, limited itself to entertaining its audiences and to momentarily distracting them from the surrounding horrors. But in so doing, it also gave their captive audiences renewed hope and the courage to face an otherwise unbearable existence.

Doubtlessly, this artistic activity provided the means for everyone concerned, audiences and actors alike, to retain a small measure of humanity, free their minds –if only momentarily– from the tragedy of daily life and nourish the illusion of survival.

Death

During the summer of 1944, increasing numbers of transports carried Westerbork's prisoners to the extermination camps in the East. Of 104,000 camp inmates, fewer than 5,000 survived. In the last transport to leave Westerbork, on 4 September 1944, Ehrlich was number 151 on the list of victims. Eyewitnesses recount that, after reaching Auschwitz, he was recognized by a Hauptsturmführer. As a result, Ehrlich was subjected to additional torture: brought before a group of SS officers holding their loaded guns aimed at him, he was ordered to tell jokes. On 1 October 1944, Ehrlich was murdered in the Auschwitz gas chambers.

On 12 April 1945, British troops liberated Westerbork. By then, only 876 prisoners were left: 464 men, 309 women, and 229 children; only two were Theatre Group members.

Filmography

Actor
 We'll Meet Again in the Heimat (1926)
 Family Gathering in the House of Prellstein (1927)
 Herkules Maier (1928)
 The Blue Mouse (1928)
 Honeymoon (1928)
 Die tolle Komteß (1928)
 German Wine (1928)
 Her Dark Secret (1929)
 The Black Domino (1929)
 Vienna, City of Song (1930)
 Hocuspocus (1930)
 Fairground People (1930)
 Der Korvettenkapitän/Blaue Jungs von der Marine (1930)
 Leutnant warst Du einst bei deinen Husaren (1930)
 Susanne Cleans Up (1930)
 Kabarett-Programm Nr. 2 (short film, 1931)
 Kabarett-Programm Nr. 6 (short film, 1931)
 Madame Pompadour (1931)
 Der Tanzhusar (1931)
 In Wien hab' ich einmal ein Mädel geliebt (1931)
 Um eine Nasenlänge (1931)
 Der Storch streikt. Siegfried der Matrose (1931)
 The Soaring Maiden (1931)
 Der Schlemihl (1931)
 Der Hochtourist (1931)
 Goldblondes Mädchen, ich schenk Dir mein Herz – Ich bin ja so verliebt... (1931/32)
 The Magic Top Hat (1932)
 Wer zahlt heute noch? (short film, 1932)
 When Love Sets the Fashion (1932)
 Herr Direktor engagiert (short film, 1932/33)

Director
 Revierkrank (short film, 1932)
 Die erste Instruktionsstunde (short film, 1932)
 Kaczmarek als Rosenkavalier (short film, 1932/33)
 Hugos Nachtarbeit (1933)

Film writer
 It Attracted Three Fellows (1928)
 Honeymoon (1928)
 Miss Chauffeur (1928)
 In Werder the Trees are in Bloom (1928)
 The Weekend Bride (1928)
 The Crazy Countess (1928)
 The House Without Men (1928)
 A Small Down Payment on Bliss (1928/29)
 Mascots (1928/29)
 The Copper (1930)
 Hugo's Nachtarbeit (short film, 1933)

References

 Original Max Ehrlich Family Documents (notably: Max Ehrlich's birth certificate, Ehrlich family wartime and post-World War II correspondence with the International Red Cross, personal letters from Max Ehrlich, etc.) from the Max Ehrlich Association Archive, Geneva Switzerland
 Zwischenwelt: Zeitschrift für Kultur des Exils und des Widerstands: "Kabarett im Exil"; ISSN 1606-4321; 20th year, Nr. 1, May 2003
 Getekend in Westerbork:Leven en werk van Leo Kok 1923–1945 (Westerbork drawings: Life and work of Leo Kok); 
 Metzler Kabarett Lexikon, by Klaus Budzinski / Reinhard Hippen; J.B. Metzler 1996; 
 Verehrt Verfolgt Vergessen, Schauspieler als Naziopfer by Ulrich Liebe; Beltz/Quadriga 1992; 
 Geschlossene Vorstellung, Der Jüdische Kulturbund in Deutschland 1933–1941; Akademie der Künste 1992; 
 Berlin Cabaret, by Peter Jelavich; Harvard University Press 1993; 
 Jüdisches Theater in Nazideutschland by Herbert Freeden; J. C. B. Mohr (Paul Siebeck) Tübingen 1964
 Theatrical Performance during the Holocaust by Rebecca Rovit and Alvin Goldfarb; Johns Hopkins University Press 1999;

Bibliography
 Heulen und Zähneklappern, Das Buch der Faulen Witze by Max Ehrlich and Paul Morgan; Eden-Verlag Berlin 1927
 Von Adelbert bis Zilzer by Max Ehrlich; Eden-Verlag Berlin 1928, 
 Special Max Reinhardt Jubilee edition: Blätter des deutschen Theaters by Willi Schaeffers, Max Ehrlich and Paul Morgan

External links
 Max Ehrlich Association Website
 
 Max Ehrlich Biography (German)
 The Westerbork Serenade
 
 
 
 

1892 births
1944 deaths
German male stage actors
Kabarettists
German male film actors
German male silent film actors
German male screenwriters
German people who died in Auschwitz concentration camp
German civilians killed in World War II
Male actors from Berlin
20th-century German male actors
People killed by gas chamber by Nazi Germany
German male writers
Film people from Berlin
German male comedians
Jewish German male actors
German Jews who died in the Holocaust
Jewish writers
20th-century German screenwriters